Saran is a village in Marz Rural District, Chah Dadkhoda District, Qaleh Ganj County, Kerman Province, Iran. At the time of the 2006 census, its population was 44 people who made up 15 families.

References 

Populated places in Qaleh Ganj County